7Y or 7-Y may refer to:

7 years
7Y, the IATA airline code for the Latvian company Med Airways
Ford 7Y, a Ford model built in the United Kingdom between 1938 and 1939

See also
Y7 (disambiguation)